The women's sprint at the 2022 Commonwealth Games was part of the cycling programme, which took place on 30 July 2022.

Records
Prior to this competition, the existing world and Games records were as follows:

Schedule
The schedule is as follows:

All times are British Summer Time (UTC+1)

Results

Qualifying
Top 16 riders qualified for the 1/8 finals.

1/8 finals
Heat winners advanced to the quarterfinals.

Quarterfinals
Matches are extended to a best-of-three format hereon; winners proceed to the semifinals.

Semifinals
Winners proceed to the gold medal final; losers proceed to the bronze medal final.

Finals
The final classification is determined in the medal finals.

References

Women's sprint
Cycling at the Commonwealth Games – Women's sprint
Comm